Union Baptist Church was a historic house of worship located in Downtown New Rochelle, in Westchester County, New York. The church was added to Westchester Inventory of Historic Places in 1994, chosen for its cultural and historical characteristics as well as for its Neo-Romanesque edifice and unique architectural details.

History

Two different congregations compose the cultural heritage of the church. It was originally built by the predominantly white Salem Baptist Church congregation. The current congregation, Union Baptist Church, is one of New Rochelle's earliest black religious organizations.

The church was designed by architect Arthur Bates Jennings, who configured the building's interior using the Akron Plan, an open spatial arrangement that is seen in only a few Westchester churches today. His use of ceiling stenciling was also unique and this church is the only one in the county to possess such detailing. 

On February 14, 2011 a 5-alarm fire ripped through the historic building, destroying much of the interior structure. The building was demolished a day after the blaze.

The congregation now worships in temporary premises a block away at 466 Main St. New Rochelle. Website: www.ubcnr.com

References

Churches in New Rochelle, New York
Baptist churches in New York (state)
Religious organizations established in 1831
19th-century Baptist churches in the United States
1831 establishments in New York (state)
Churches completed in 1904
Church fires in the United States
Former churches in New York (state)
Destroyed churches
Demolished churches in New York (state)
Buildings and structures demolished in 2011